Blonde Roots is a prose novel written by British-Nigerian author Bernardine Evaristo. Published by Penguin UK in 2009 and Penguin USA in 2010, this satirical novel reverts notions of transatlantic slavery, placing Africans as masters of European slaves. In 2009, it was the Orange Prize Youth Panel Choice and the Big Red Read Award.

Reception

Reviews 
Evaristo has been praised for her historical approach within Blonde Roots. In the UK, The Independent declared, ‘In her new novel, Bernardine Evaristo, never one to shrink from an experiment, has taken her boldest step to date and turned the whole thing on its head... One of the best things about this book is its bittersweet, riotous humour...Running through these pages is not just a feisty, hyperactive imagination asking ‘’what if”, but the unhealed African heart with the question, ‘‘how does it feel?”. This is a powerful gesture of thematic ownership by one of the UK’s most unusual and challenging writers.’ Meanwhile, the Publishers Weekly in the US stated, ‘British novelist Evaristo delivers an astonishing, uncomfortable and beautiful alternative history that goes back several centuries to flip the slave trade...Evaristo’s intellectually rigorous narrative constantly surprises..This difficult and provocative book is a conversation sparker.'

Honours and awards 
 2009: International Dublin Literary Award, nominated
 2009: Orange Prize for Fiction, nominated
 2009: Orange Prize Youth Panel Choice for Blonde Roots
 2009: Arthur C. Clarke Award, nominated

Publication information 
 Blonde Roots (Hamish Hamilton/Penguin, 2008; Riverhead/Penguin, USA, 2009)

References 

2009 British novels
Novels by Bernardine Evaristo
Hamish Hamilton books